Licking View is an unincorporated community in Muskingum County, Ohio, United States. Licking View is located along the Licking River near the western border of Zanesville.

References

Unincorporated communities in Muskingum County, Ohio
Unincorporated communities in Ohio